Aladdin and His Wonderful Lamp is a two-reel animated cartoon short subject in the Popeye Color Specials series, produced in Technicolor and released to theaters on April 7, 1939, by Paramount Pictures. It was produced by Max Fleischer, and directed by Dave Fleischer for Fleischer Studios, Inc., with David Tendlar serving as head animator, and music being supervised by Sammy Timberg. The voice of Popeye is performed by Jack Mercer, with additional voices by Margie Hines as Olive Oyl and Carl Meyer as the evil Wazzir.

Plot
This short features Olive as a screenwriter for Surprise Pictures, working on a treatment of the story of Aladdin that will feature herself as the beautiful princess and Popeye as Aladdin, all the while speaking in rhyme. As she types, her adaptation of Aladdin comes to life on the screen, with Popeye having to use his wits against an evil vizier who seeks to control a magic lamp inhabited by a powerful genie. After completing the script, Olive gets a termination of employment notice from the front office, which reads "Your story of Aladdin is being thrown out... and so are you! [signed] Surprise."

As in many Popeye cartoons, many of the gags are conveyed using dialogue. As Princess Olive awaits Popeye/Aladdin's declaration of his love, he turns to the camera and remarks "I don't know what to say... I've never made love in Technicolor before!" During the climactic battle between Aladdin and the vizier, Olive screams out "Help! Popeye—I mean Aladdin—save me!!"

Release and reception
This short was the last of the three Popeye Color Specials, which were, at over sixteen minutes each, three times as long as a regular Popeye cartoon, and were often billed in theaters alongside or above the main feature. Unlike the first two films, Aladdin and His Wonderful Lamp is more Disney-esque in plot and pacing, and does not make use of the Fleischer Tabletop 3D background process. According to the film's press release, its making involved two hundred colors and twenty-eight thousand individual, full-color drawings; the press release also mentions 3D animation, but such footage was never used in the final version. However, a glimpse can be obtained in a Popular Science short, which documents the film's making, and reveals a sculpted model of the castle being photographed. Running at twenty-one minutes, Aladdin and His Wonderful Lamp is the longest entry in the "color feature" series, and the only one produced at the relocated Fleischer Studios facility in Miami, Florida. Footage from the short, with a new soundtrack and rerecorded dialogue, was reused in the 1949 cartoon "Popeye's Premiere," wherein it is presented as a motion picture that Popeye starred in.

Today, this short and the other two Popeye Color Specials, Popeye the Sailor Meets Sindbad the Sailor and Popeye the Sailor Meets Ali Baba's Forty Thieves (both of which were also adapted from a story featured in One Thousand and One Nights), are in the public domain, and are widely available on various home video and DVD collections, usually transferred from poor quality, old, faded prints. Warner Bros. has fully restored this cartoon with the original Paramount mountain logo opening and closing titles and is included in Popeye the Sailor: 1938-1940, Volume 2, which was released on June 17, 2008.  It also includes a documentary on the making of this cartoon as a bonus feature in this collection. This version also aired one time on Turner Classic Movies' celebration of Fleischer Studios during October 2021.

References

External links
 
Aladdin and His Wonderful Lamp at the TCM Movie Database
 

1930s English-language films
1939 animated films
1939 short films
1930s American animated films
1930s animated short films
1930s color films
Films based on Aladdin
Popeye the Sailor theatrical cartoons
Genies in film
American comedy short films
Paramount Pictures short films
Fleischer Studios short films
Short films directed by Dave Fleischer
American animated short films
Films set in the Middle East